The Flammenwerfer M.16. was a German man-portable backpack flamethrower that was used in World War I in trench warfare. It was the first flamethrower ever used in combat, in 1916 at Verdun. It was also used in 1918 in the battle of Argonne Forest in France against Allied forces, as featured in the 2001 film The Lost Battalion, although an account in a 1917 issue of The Living Age suggests eye witness accounts of it being used at the Battle of the Somme in 1916.

Historic Background 
War is a cruel event that devours all those involved with it. As war progresses it pushes men to make continuous cruel weapons. The use of fire is one kind of cruel weapons. Ever since the Byzantine Empire first used the concept of incendiary weapons such as the Greek fire in the seventh century during naval battles to great effect. The Greeks, Chinese, and Arabic armies implemented incendiary weapons great effect. However the real example of how utterly terrifying these weapons were, was doing the Great War (World War 1), where they were used with utterly frightening effect.

Development 
As the industrial revolution grew across all of Europe the desire for more powerful and effective weapons continued to grow. In 1901 Germany, a private citizen named Richard Fiedler designed and patented the first modern deign of a flamethrower. In the same year the Imperial German army took notice and funded his project. Fiedler would continue to work and deign on several flamethrowers, and presented them to the German army in 1905. After receiving some feed back, he delivered two versions of the Flammenwerfer for army use. Finally in 1911 the German arm accepted his designs into service. About the same time another man named Bernhard Reddemann began his own development of the flamethrower. He was a officer in the German pioneer battalion in the reserves, as well as a firefighter in the civilian world. As his curiosity with the use of kerosene as a weapon of war, he started to blend the pumping power of a hose for fire fighting, with the effectiveness of fire as a defensive weapon. As the First World War started he went back to active duty . By the second year of the war he was commanding a flamethrower pioneer battalion. Thanks to his command and use a whole regiment was installed. Although Fielder was the real inventor of the flamethrower, it was Reddemann who used it to great success on the battlefield.

Instructional Use 
The Flammenwerfer M.16 was a two man operated system, with one man wearing a back pack full of fuel, and the other man holding the nozzle to aim towards the desire target. As the fuel hit the open fire in front of the nozzle, spraying flames about 20-30 yards with a continues spray for 20-40 seconds. Although very portable it was not able to be carried by one person.

WW1 
At the outbreak of the Great War the German army started to look for towards the Flammenwerfer as a means to break the dead lock facing the western front. During the battle of Verdun in 1916 where German pioneers and shock troopers used it to deadly effect. They would be the front of the attack, clearing trenches and piercing soft points in enemy lines, allowing for more troops to enter. A unnamed French officer witnessed the German flamethrower in actions saying they were so terrifying that not even words described could them, and although as they assaulted and many fell, they still completed their mission. The flamethrower pioneers were successful in about 80% of their missions, turning the tide of battle and instilling fear into their enemies hearts. They were so effective that there is only 890 deaths reported compared to the millions that died around them.

Inter-War Use 
After the Treaty of Versailles Germany became the hot bed for chaos and communist revolutionaries. During this time the Germany army as well as the Freikorps, a right wing militia, used the Flammenwerfer to disperse crowds.

See also
List of flamethrowers

Citations

1910s establishments in Germany
1910s disestablishments in Germany
Flamethrowers
World War I German infantry weapons